Jan August Cichocki (1750–1795) was a Polish military officer and a general of the Polish Army, notable for his service in the Warsaw Uprising (1794). Thanks to a scholarship funded by Alois Bruhl, Cichocki studied artillery tactics in Dresden. Upon his return to Poland, he co-authored the military reforms of 1776–1779. At the same time until May 1792 he was the commanding officer of the Polish 5th Rifle Regiment, after which he was the creator and the first commander of the Polish 15th Regiment of Foot. One of the commanders of the garrison of Warsaw during the Warsaw Uprising (1794), he joined the Kościuszko's Uprising soon afterwards. On June 20 Tadeusz Kościuszko promoted him to the rank of General and nominated him to the post of the commander of the Narew river front, where however he showed little value as a front commander. Dismissed to some unimportant post in Warsaw, where he died November 18, 1795, and was buried at the Holy Cross cemetery in Warsaw.

Polish generals
Generals of the Polish–Lithuanian Commonwealth
1750 births
1795 deaths